Suvendu Raj Ghosh is an Indian Bengali and Hindi film director. He is known for his movies Chase No Mercy To Crime, Shunyota, Chetna, Bhoy, and Abelay Garam Bhaat. He won best debutant director award at Goa International film festival. His upcoming movies Main Mulayam Singh Yadav and Suroor is set release in late 2020.

Filmography
 Obelai Goram Bhat (Bengali) 
 Bhay (Bengali)
 Chetana (Bengali)
 Everyday is Sunday (Bengali)
 Shunyata (Bengali)
 Chase No Mercy To Crime
 Main Mulayam Singh Yadav
Before You Die

References

Indian film directors
Bengali film directors
Living people
Year of birth missing (living people)
Place of birth missing (living people)